David Anthony Pizzuto (July 9, 1951 – February 10, 2012) was a Canadian-born American voice actor best known for contributing to video games such as Crash Team Racing as Nitros Oxide and Komodo Joe and also Papu Papu  from the Crash Bandicoot series, Fallout: New Vegas, Tanno Vik from Star Wars: The Old Republic and for voicing the Family Guy version of Willem Dafoe.

Death
Pizzuto died on February 10, 2012, following a brief illness.

Filmography

Television

Videogames

References

External links 

1951 births
2012 deaths
Canadian expatriates in the United States
American male voice actors
Canadian male voice actors